The Periodical Marketers of Canada Indigenous Literature Awards, also known as the First Nation Communities Read Awards, is an annual Canadian literary award presented to Indigenous Canadian writers. 

First Nation Communities Read was established in 2003 to help bring awareness to and support First Nation, Métis, and Inuit authors, publishers, and illustrators. In 2012, Periodical Markers of Canada signed on and has since provided winners with a $5,000 prize.

First Nation Communities Read receives support from the Government of Canada, the Ontario Library Service, publishers, librarians, and the general public.

Recipients

References 

English-language literary awards
Canadian children's literary awards
21st-century literary awards
First Nations literary awards
Awards established in 2003
2003 establishments in Canada